Visnaga is a genus of flowering plants belonging to the carrot family Apiaceae.

Its native range is Macaronesia, Mediterranean to Iran, and north-eastern tropical Africa.

Species
There are two species recognised in the genus Visnaga:
 Visnaga crinita (Guss.) Giardina & Raimondo 
 Visnaga daucoides Gaertn.

References

Apiaceae
Apiaceae genera